The following outline is provided as an overview of and topical guide to Vanuatu:

Vanuatu – sovereign island nation located in the South Pacific Ocean. The archipelago is of volcanic origin. Vanuatu was first inhabited by Melanesian people. Europeans began to settle in the area in the late 18th century. In the 1880s France and the United Kingdom claimed parts of the country and in 1906 they agreed on a framework for jointly managing the archipelago through a British-French Condominium as the New Hebrides. An independence movement was established in the 1970s, and the Republic of Vanuatu was created in 1980.

General reference 

 Pronunciation:
 Common English country name:  Vanuatu
 Official English country name:  The Republic of Vanuatu
 Common endonym(s):  
 Official endonym(s):  
 Adjectival(s): Ni-Vanuatu, Vanuatuan
 Demonym(s):
 Etymology: Name of Vanuatu
 ISO country codes:  VU, VUT, 548
 ISO region codes:  See ISO 3166-2:VU
 Internet country code top-level domain:  .vu

Geography of Vanuatu 

Geography of Vanuatu
 Vanuatu is: a country
 Location:
 Southern Hemisphere and Eastern Hemisphere
 Oceania
 Melanesia
 Time zone:  UTC+11
 Extreme points of Vanuatu
 High:  Mount Tabwemasana on Espiritu Santo 
 Low:  South Pacific Ocean 0 m
 Land boundaries:  none
 Coastline:  South Pacific Ocean 
 Population of Vanuatu:  301,000  - 173th most populous country

 Area of Vanuatu: 
 Atlas of Vanuatu

Environment of Vanuatu 

 Climate of Vanuatu
 Renewable energy in Vanuatu
 Geology of Vanuatu
 Protected areas of Vanuatu
 Biosphere reserves in Vanuatu
 National parks of Vanuatu
 Wildlife of Vanuatu
 Fauna of Vanuatu
 Birds of Vanuatu
 Mammals of Vanuatu

Natural geographic features of Vanuatu 

 Islands of Vanuatu
 Lakes of Vanuatu
 Mountains of Vanuatu
 Volcanoes in Vanuatu
 Rivers of Vanuatu
 Waterfalls of Vanuatu
 Valleys of Vanuatu
 World Heritage Sites in Vanuatu: Chief Roi Mata’s Domain

Regions of Vanuatu 

Regions of Vanuatu

Ecoregions of Vanuatu 

List of ecoregions in Vanuatu
 Ecoregions in Vanuatu

Administrative divisions of Vanuatu 

Administrative divisions of Vanuatu
 Provinces of Vanuatu

Provinces of Vanuatu 

Provinces of Vanuatu

Torba
Malampa
Penama
Sanma
Shefa
Tafea

Demography of Vanuatu 

Demographics of Vanuatu

Government and politics of Vanuatu 

Politics of Vanuatu
 Form of government: parliamentary representative democratic republic
 Capital of Vanuatu: Port Vila
 Elections in Vanuatu
 Political parties in Vanuatu

Branches of the government of Vanuatu 

Government of Vanuatu

Executive branch of the government of Vanuatu 
 Head of state: President of Vanuatu, Nikenike Vurobaravu
 Head of government: Prime Minister of Vanuatu, Moana Carcasses Kalosil
 Cabinet: Council of Ministers of Vanuatu
 Malvatu Mauri (National Council of Chiefs) - role is advisory only

Legislative branch of the government of Vanuatu 
 Parliament of Vanuatu (unicameral)

Judicial branch of the government of Vanuatu 

Court system of Vanuatu
 Court of Appeal of Vanuatu
 Supreme Court of Vanuatu
 Magistrates Court of Vanuatu
 Island courts of Vanuatu

Foreign relations of Vanuatu 

Foreign relations of Vanuatu
 Diplomatic missions in Vanuatu
 Diplomatic missions of Vanuatu

International organization membership 
The Republic of Vanuatu is a member of:

African, Caribbean, and Pacific Group of States (ACP)
Asian Development Bank (ADB)
Commonwealth of Nations
Food and Agriculture Organization (FAO)
Group of 77 (G77)
International Bank for Reconstruction and Development (IBRD)
International Civil Aviation Organization (ICAO)
International Development Association (IDA)
International Federation of Red Cross and Red Crescent Societies (IFRCS)
International Finance Corporation (IFC)
International Labour Organization (ILO)
International Maritime Organization (IMO)
International Monetary Fund (IMF)
International Olympic Committee (IOC)
International Red Cross and Red Crescent Movement (ICRM)
International Telecommunication Union (ITU)
International Trade Union Confederation (ITUC)

Multilateral Investment Guarantee Agency (MIGA)
Nonaligned Movement (NAM)
Organisation internationale de la Francophonie (OIF)
Organisation for the Prohibition of Chemical Weapons (OPCW)
Organization of American States (OAS) (observer)
 The Pacific Community (SPC)
Pacific Islands Forum (PIF)
South Pacific Regional Trade and Economic Cooperation Agreement (Sparteca)
United Nations (UN)
United Nations Conference on Trade and Development (UNCTAD)
United Nations Educational, Scientific, and Cultural Organization (UNESCO)
United Nations Industrial Development Organization (UNIDO)
Universal Postal Union (UPU)
World Health Organization (WHO)
World Meteorological Organization (WMO)
World Trade Organization (WTO) (observer)

Law and order in Vanuatu 

Law of Vanuatu
 Constitution of Vanuatu
 Crime in Vanuatu
 Human rights in Vanuatu
 LGBT rights in Vanuatu
 Freedom of religion in Vanuatu
 Law enforcement in Vanuatu

Military of Vanuatu 

Military of Vanuatu
Vanuatu has no military per se. The Vanuatu Mobile Force is a paramilitary force within the police force.

Local government in Vanuatu 

Local government in Vanuatu

History of Vanuatu 

History of Vanuatu
 Timeline of the history of Vanuatu
 Current events of Vanuatu
 Military history of Vanuatu

Culture of Vanuatu 

Culture of Vanuatu
 Architecture of Vanuatu
 Cuisine of Vanuatu
 Festivals in Vanuatu
 Languages of Vanuatu
 Southern Oceanic languages
 Media in Vanuatu
 National symbols of Vanuatu
 Coat of arms of Vanuatu
 Flag of Vanuatu
 National anthem of Vanuatu
 People of Vanuatu
 Public holidays in Vanuatu
 Records of Vanuatu
 Religion in Vanuatu
 Christianity in Vanuatu
 Hinduism in Vanuatu
 Islam in Vanuatu
 Judaism in Vanuatu
 Sikhism in Vanuatu
 World Heritage Sites in Vanuatu

Art in Vanuatu 
 Art in Vanuatu
 Cinema of Vanuatu
 Literature of Vanuatu
 Music of Vanuatu
 Television in Vanuatu
 Theatre in Vanuatu

Sports in Vanuatu 

Sports in Vanuatu
 Football in Vanuatu
 Vanuatu at the Olympics

Economy and infrastructure of Vanuatu 

Economy of Vanuatu
 Economic rank, by nominal GDP (2007): 178th (one hundred and seventy eighth)
 Agriculture in Vanuatu
 Banking in Vanuatu
 National Bank of Vanuatu
 Communications in Vanuatu
 Internet in Vanuatu
 Companies of Vanuatu
Currency of Vanuatu: Vatu
ISO 4217: VUV
 Energy in Vanuatu
 Energy policy of Vanuatu
 Oil industry in Vanuatu
 Mining in Vanuatu
 Tourism in Vanuatu
 Visa policy of Vanuatu
 Transport in Vanuatu
 Vanuatu Stock Exchange

Education in Vanuatu 

Education in Vanuatu

Infrastructure of Vanuatu 
 Health care in Vanuatu
 Transportation in Vanuatu
 Airports in Vanuatu
 Rail transport in Vanuatu
 Roads in Vanuatu
 Water supply and sanitation in Vanuatu

See also 

Vanuatu
Index of Vanuatu-related articles
List of international rankings
List of Vanuatu-related topics
Member state of the Commonwealth of Nations
Member state of the United Nations
Outline of geography
Outline of Oceania

References

External links 

Interactive maps of Vanuatu
Republic of Vanuatu government
Vanuatu National Tourism Office

Vanuatu Energy and Rural Economic Development Study

Vanuatu
Vanuatu
 01